Choucair is a surname. Notable people with the surname include:

Bechara Choucair (born 1973), Lebanese-born American healthcare professional
Mohammad Choucair (born 1987), Lebanese politician
Saloua Raouda Choucair (1916–2017), Lebanese painter and sculptor

See also
Choutair